Thoen may refer to one of the following.

 Thoen District in Lampang Province, Thailand
 Thoen Stone, sandstone slab dated 1834, discovered in South Dakota, USA

Thoen (name)

See also 
 Thone (disambiguation)
 Thorn (disambiguation)
 Toen (disambiguation)